Pseudosamanea cubana is a tree species in the legume family (Fabaceae). It is found only in Cuba.

Presently, this is the only member of the genus Pseudosamanea. Pseudosamanea guachapele is a junior synonym of Albizia guachapele.

Footnotes

References
  (2005): Genus Pseudosamanea. Version 10.01, November 2005. Retrieved 2008-MAR-30.

Mimosoids
Flora of Cuba
Vulnerable plants
Fabaceae genera
Taxonomy articles created by Polbot